Manuel Cardo Romero, known as Manolo Cardo (born 16 April 1940) is a Spanish former professional football player and manager.

Career
Born in Coria del Río, Cardo has managed club sides including Sevilla Atlético, Sevilla, Cádiz, Recreativo de Huelva, Xerez, Las Palmas and Atlético Marbella.

External links

1940 births
Living people
People from Coria del Río
Sportspeople from the Province of Seville
Spanish footballers
Association football midfielders
La Liga players
Segunda División players
Tercera División players
CD San Fernando players
Sevilla FC players
Algeciras CF footballers
Recreativo de Huelva players
Real Avilés CF footballers
Spanish football managers
La Liga managers
Segunda División managers
Segunda División B managers
Sevilla Atlético managers
Sevilla FC managers
Cádiz CF managers
Recreativo de Huelva managers
Xerez CD managers
UD Las Palmas managers